Marginal Return is the rate of return for a marginal increase in investment; roughly, this is the additional output resulting from a one-unit increase in the use of a variable input, while other inputs are constant.

See also
Diminishing returns
Returns (economics)

Investment
Marginal concepts